Ebo or EBO may refer to:

People
 Ebo of Rheims (775–851), archbishop of Reims
 Ebo Andoh (born 1993), Ghanaian footballer 
 Ebo Elder (born 1978), American boxer
 Ebo Taylor (born 1936), Ghanaian musician
 Halim Ebo (born 1989), Egyptian volleyball player

Places
 Ebo, Angola, a town and municipality
 Ebo, Missouri, an unincorporated community in Washington County
 Ebo Landing, site of a mass suicide by Igbo slaves in the United States
 Ebo Wildlife Reserve, Cameroon
 Ebo (Eastbourne) England, the abbreviation a town in South East England

Other uses 
 Ebo (spider), a spider genus
 Boo dialect of the Central Teke language
 Ebo Gospels, an early Carolingian illuminated Gospel book
 Ebon Airport, in the Marshall Islands
 Effects-based operations
 Eisenbahn-Bau- und Betriebsordnung, a German law
 Elmshorn-Barmstedt-Oldesloe railway, in Germany
 European Board of Ophthalmology
 Hellenic Arms Industry, a Greek arms manufacturer
 Igbo people, an ethnic group of Nigeria